Gorlago is a comune (municipality) in the Province of Bergamo in the Italian region of Lombardy, located about  northeast of Milan and about  southeast of Bergamo. 

Gorlago borders the following municipalities: Bolgare, Carobbio degli Angeli, Costa di Mezzate, Montello, San Paolo d'Argon, Trescore Balneario.

The opera singer Luigi Bolis owned a villa and farm estate on the banks of the Cherio River in Gorlago in the late 19th century and died there in 1905.

References

External links
 www.comune.gorlago.bg.it